Pelagothuriidae is a family of deep-sea swimming sea cucumbers. They are somewhat unusual in appearance, in comparison with other sea cucumbers, having numerous appendages, including conical papillae and leaf-like tentacles. Most of them are benthopelagic, which means that they are able to swim for a time from the bottom : the species Pelagothuria natatrix is the only true pelagic holothurian (and echinoderm, to date) ; it looks like a jellyfish. Most members of the order inhabit deep-sea environments, like Enypniastes.

Classification
Family: Pelagothuriidae
 genus Enypniastes Théel, 1882
 genus Pelagothuria Ludwig, 1893

References

Notes 

Echinoderm families